Vincent-Joseph Pottier (11 April 1897 – 4 February 1980) was a Liberal party member of the House of Commons of Canada. He was the first Acadian from Nova Scotia elected to the House of Commons and the first Acadian to serve on the Nova Scotia Supreme Court.

Early life and education
He was born in Belleville, Nova Scotia to Augustin and Rose Emma Pothier. He graduated from Dalhousie Law School in 1920 and was a barrister by trade.

Political career
Pottier served as a school commissioner and town councillor.

He was first elected to Parliament at the Shelburne—Yarmouth—Clare riding in the 1935 general election, the first Acadian from Nova Scotia to join the House of Commons. He was re-elected in 1940. After completing his second term, the 19th Canadian Parliament, Pottier did not seek further re-election in 1945.

Judicial career
In 1947, Pottier was appointed a judge at County Court number 1 in Halifax. On 4 January 1965, he became the first Acadian appointed to the Nova Scotia Supreme Court, serving in that role until his retirement after five years. In his final years, he donated his time supporting the Dalhousie Legal Aid Service.

References

External links
 

1897 births
1980 deaths
Acadian people
People from Yarmouth County
Judges in Nova Scotia
Lawyers in Nova Scotia
Liberal Party of Canada MPs
Members of the House of Commons of Canada from Nova Scotia
New Brunswick municipal councillors